Governor Williamson may refer to:

Isaac Halstead Williamson, 8th Governor of New Jersey
William D. Williamson, 2nd Governor of Maine